Harold Houlahan (14 February 1930 – 5 March 2018) was an English professional footballer who played as an inside left in the Football League for Oldham Athletic and Darlington, and in non-league football for Durham City and Spennymoor United. He was also on the books of Newcastle United without playing for them in the League. Houlahan died in Darlington on 5 March 2018, at the age of 88.

References

1930 births
2018 deaths
People from Coundon
Footballers from County Durham
English footballers
Association football inside forwards
Durham City A.F.C. players
Newcastle United F.C. players
Oldham Athletic A.F.C. players
Darlington F.C. players
Spennymoor United F.C. players
English Football League players